Cracklin' is an album recorded by American jazz drummer Roy Haynes with tenor saxophonist Booker Ervin and released in July 1963 by Prestige Records.
The two tracks written by pianist Ronnie Mathews–"Honeydew" and "Dorian"– were also released on single by the parent Prestige label.

Reception

Allmusic awarded the album 4 stars stating: "Most of drummer Roy Haynes' dates as a leader put the focus on a star soloist... Ervin's unique sound, soulful yet very advanced, is well showcased".

Track listing 
 "Scoochie" (Booker Ervin) – 5:53
 "Dorian" (Ronnie Mathews) – 6:48
 "Sketch of Melba" (Randy Weston) – 7:37
 "Honeydew" (Mathews) – 3:46
 "Under Paris Skies" (Hubert Giraud) – 7:40
 "Bad News Blues" (Roy Haynes) – 6:49

Personnel 
Roy Haynes – drums
Booker Ervin – tenor saxophone
Ronnie Mathews – piano
Larry Ridley – bass

References 

1963 albums
Roy Haynes albums
Prestige Records albums
Albums produced by Ozzie Cadena
Albums recorded at Van Gelder Studio